Marcus Island LORAN-C transmitter, or Minami Torishima LORAN-C transmitter, is a former LORAN-C transmitter on Minami-Tori-shima (Marcus Island) in Ogasawara, Tokyo, Japan at . Until 1993 it was part of Grid 9970 and used a transmission power of 4000 kilowatts, which was more than the most powerful broadcasting stations ever used.

In October 1993 the authority over the transmitter was transferred from the United States Coast Guard to the Japan Coast Guard. In 2000 the tower of the station was again dismantled and replaced by a new one with a height of 213 meters.

Marcus Island LORAN-C transmitter was the X-Ray secondary station of the North West Pacific LORAN-C Chain GRI 8930. Its transmission power was reduced to 1100 kilowatts.

On December 1, 2009, the station was abolished due to a decline in users. The mast has been demolished.

See also
 List of masts

References

External links
 Excel-File with information about LORAN-C transmitters
 
 Building 56828
 Building 57079
 Building 57185
 
 
 

LORAN-C transmitters in Japan
Buildings and structures in Tokyo